

Engineering colleges of Far-western University
School of Engineering
        Civil Engineering
        Computer Engineering

Engineering colleges of Kathmandu University
School of Science
     Environmental Engineering

School of Engineering
     Civil Engineering
     Mechanical Engineering
     Computer Engineering
     Electrical & Electronics 
        Engineering
     Geomatics Engineering
     Chemical Engineering

Engineering colleges of Mid Western University
Graduate School of Engineering
 Civil Engineering
 Computer Engineering
 Hydropower Engineering

Engineering colleges of Pokhara University
School of Engineering
        Civil Engineering
        Electrical & Electronics Engineering

Equivalent Colleges
Madan Bhandari Memorial Academy Nepal
        Civil Engineering
        Computer Engineering
        Bachelor in Architecture
        Masters in Construction Management

Affiliated Engineering Colleges of Pokhara University
Gandaki College of Engineering
        Software Engineering 
        Computer Engineering
Cosmos College of Management & Technology
        Civil Engineering
        Electronics & Communication Engineering
        Computer Engineering
        Information Technology
National Academy of Science & Technology, Dhangadhi Engineering College
        Civil Engineering
        Computer Engineering
Nepal College of Information Technology
        Civil Engineering
        Electronics & Communication Engineering
        Computer Engineering
        Software Engineering
        Information Technology
Nepal Engineering College
        Civil Engineering
        Electronics & Communication Engineering
        Computer Engineering
        Architecture Engineering
        Electrical & Electronics Engineering
        Civil & Rural Engineering
Lumbini Engineering, Management & Science College
        Civil Engineering
        Electronics & Communication Engineering
        Computer Engineering
        Electrical & Electronics Engineering
Pokhara Engineering College
        Civil Engineering
        Computer Engineering
        Electronics & Communication Engineering
Oxford College of Engineering & Management
        Civil Engineering
        Computer Engineering
        Electrical & Electronics Engineering
Everest Engineering & Management College
        Civil Engineering
        Electronics & Communication Engineering
        Computer Engineering
Rapti Engineering College
        Civil Engineering
        Electronics & Communication Engineering
United Technical College
        Civil Engineering
        Electrical & Electronics Engineering
Universal Science College
        Civil Engineering
College Of Engineering & Management
        Civil Engineering
Nepal Western Academy
        Civil Engineering

Engineering colleges of Purbanchal University
School of Engineering & Technology
        Electronics & Communication Engineering
        Computer Engineering

Affiliated Engineering Colleges of Purbanchal University
Acme Engineering College
        Civil Engineering
        Electronics & Communication Engineering
        Computer Engineering
        Architecture Engineering
Himalayan White house International College
        Civil Engineering
        Electronics & Communication Engineering
        Computer Engineering
Kantipur City College
        Civil Engineering
        Electronics & Communication Engineering
        Computer Engineering
Eastern College of Engineering
        Civil Engineering
        Electronics & Communication Engineering
        Computer Engineering
Khwopa Engineering College
        Civil Engineering
        Electrical Engineering
        Electronics & Communication Engineering
        Computer Engineering
        Architecture Engineering
Himalayan Institute of Science & Tech.
        Civil Engineering
        Electronics & Communication Engineering
College of Biomedical Engineering & Applied Science
        Biomedical Engineering
Aryan School Of Engineering
        Civil Engineering
Central Engineering college
        Civil Engineering
Geomatics Institute Of Technology
        Geomatics Engineering
Kantipur International College
        Civil Engineering
        Architecture Engineering
Nepal polytechnic Institute
        Civil Engineering
        Electronics Engineering
Hillside College of Engineering
        Civil Engineering
        Electrical Engineering
Morgan Engineering & Management College
        Civil Engineering
        Electrical Engineering
Lord Buddha college of Engineering & Management (LBCEM)
        Computer Engineering
        Electrical Engineering
Caliber College Of Engineering
        Civil Engineering
        Electronics & Communication Engineering
Pathibhara Centre for Advance Studies
        Civil Engineering
        Electronics & Communication Engineering
        Computer Engineering

Engineering colleges of Tribhuwan University
Institute of Engineering (IOE), Purwanchal Campus
        Civil Engineering
        Agriculture Engineering
        Mechanical Engineering
        Electrical Engineering
        Electronics Communication and Information Engineering
        Computer Engineering
        Architecture Engineering
Institute of Engineering (IOE), Pashchimanchal Campus
        Civil Engineering
        Electronics Communication and Information Engineering
        Mechanical Engineering
        Electrical Engineering
        Computer Engineering 
        Geomatics Engineering
        Automobile Engineering
Institute of Engineering (IOE), Pulchowk Campus
        Civil Engineering
        Electrical Engineering
        Electronics Communication and Information Engineering
        Mechanical Engineering
        Computer Engineering
        Architecture Engineering
        Aerospace Engineering
        Chemical Engineering
Institute of Engineering (IOE), Thapathali Campus
        Civil Engineering
        Electronics Communication and Information Engineering
        Mechanical Engineering
        Industrial Engineering
        Automobile Engineering
        Computer Engineering
        Architecture Engineering
Institute of Engineering (IOE), Chitwan Engineering Campus
        Architecture Engineering

Affiliated Engineering Colleges of Tribhuwan University

Advanced Colleges of Engineering  & Management
        Civil Engineering
        Electrical Engineering
        Electronics Communication and Information Engineering
        Computer Engineering
Himalaya College of Engineering
        Civil Engineering
        Electronics Communication and Information Engineering
        Computer Engineering
        Architecture Engineering
Kantipur Engineering College
        Civil Engineering
        Electronics Communication and Information Engineering
        Computer Engineering
Kathmandu Engineering College
        Civil Engineering
        Electrical Engineering
        Electronics Communication and Information Engineering
        Computer Engineering
        Architecture Engineering
Khwopa College of Engineering
        Civil Engineering
        Electrical Engineering
Janakpur Engineering College
        Civil Engineering
        Electronics Communication and Information Engineering
        Computer Engineering
Kathford College of Engineering and Management
        Civil Engineering
        Electronics Communication and Information Engineering
        Computer Engineering
Sagarmatha Engineering College
        Civil Engineering
        Electronics Communication and Information Engineering
        Computer Engineering
Lalitpur Engineering College
        Civil Engineering
        Computer Engineering
National College of Engineering 
        Civil Engineering 
        Electrical Engineering
        Electronics Communication and Information Engineering
        Computer Engineering

References

External links
 Far-Western University
 Kathmandu University
 Mid-Western University
 Pokhara University
 Purbanchal University
 Tribhuwan University

 
Nepal
Nepal education-related lists